Significant event in the sciences about the terrestrial environment of Earth in 2022 – the environmental sciences.

For information about significant events in the environment and environmental policy see 2022 in the environment.

Events

See also

General
2020s in environmental history
2022 in climate change
Green recovery
2022 in space
List of environmental issues
Outline of environmental studies

Natural environment
List of large volcanic eruptions in the 21st century
Lists of extinct animals#Recent extinction
:Category:Species described in 2022
:Category:Protected areas established in 2022

Artificial development
Timeline of sustainable energy research 2020–present
2022 in rail transport
Human impact on the environment

References

Environmental sciences